Ernst Karl Heinrich, Count Hoyos-Sprinzenstein (18 June 1830, Vienna - 21 August 1903, Ternitz) was an Austrian nobleman, landowner, and politician.

Biography 
The Hoyos family was originally from Spain and emigrated to Austria in the 16th century, to serve the Emperor Ferdinand I, who was also of Spanish origin. His grandfather, was an Imperial Count.  

He was an Imperial-royal Chamberlain and, in 1861, was appointed by Emperor Franz Joseph I as a hereditary member of the Herrenhaus of the Austrian Reichsrats. He occasionally served as its Vice-President. From 1874 to 1883, he was a member of the building commission for the new Austrian Parliament Building; constructed on the Ringstraße. 

This made it possible to build the First Vienna Mountain Spring Pipeline, the city's first major source of safe drinking water. The spring had been passed down in his family since 1555.

His most notable achievement was the reconstruction of the partially ruined Rosenburg Castle. It was made partially accessible to the public before the end of the 19th century, and is still a major tourist attraction.

He was a Knight in the Order of the Golden Fleece and, after donating his spring, was named an Honorary Citizen of Vienna.

References

Further reading 
 Michael S. Habsburg-Lothringen: "Die Familie Hoyos. Geschichte und Persönlichkeiten". In: Adel im Wandel. Politik, Kultur, Konfession 1500–1700. Exhibition catalog, Rosenburg 1990,  Niederösterreichischen Landesregierung, Kulturabteilung, Vienna 1990, pps. 565–576.
 Hans Hoyos: "Horner Schloßherren aus der Familie Hoyos". In: Festschrift zur 50-Jahrfeier des Höbarthmuseums und Museumsvereins in Horn. Horn 1980

1830 births
1903 deaths
Counts of the Holy Roman Empire
Members of the Austrian Parliament
Counts of Austria
Order of the Golden Fleece